Arkansas Traveler is an alternative folk album released by American singer-songwriter Michelle Shocked in 1992. Her fourth album for Mercury Records, the songs focused around the roots of her music. The album included collaborations with several other artists, including Taj Mahal, Alison Krauss, Tony Levin and Norman Blake.  Jack Irons plays drums at the beginning of track 6. Uncle Tupelo plays on track 6.

Reception
Reviewing the album for Rolling Stone, Mark Kemp gave it four stars out of five, calling it "ambitious". William Ruhlmann of AllMusic also gave the album four stars out of five. He also found it an ambitious album, calling Shocked "feisty" and "exuberant". He also noted the album's lack of commercial success.
Her desire to have the cover portray her in blackface in tribute to the roots of the music featured on the album drew criticism and a change in the cover art.

Track listing
All tracks composed by Michelle Shocked; except where noted.
"33 RPM Soul" – 4:10
"Come a Long Way" – 4:43
"Secret to a Long Life" – 3:50
"Contest Coming (Cripple Creek)" – 3:35
"Over the Waterfall" – 4:39
"Shaking Hands (Soldier's Joy)" – 3:25
"Jump Jim Crow" – 3:32
"Hold Me Back (Frankie and Johnnie)" – 5:09
"Strawberry Jam" – 4:33
"Prodigal Daughter (Cotton Eyed Joe)" – 6:43
"Blackberry Blossom" – 3:31
"Weaving Way" – 2:57
"Arkansas Traveler" – 4:20
"Woody's Rag" (Woody Guthrie) – 2:51

Personnel
Michelle Shocked as "Arkansas Traveler" – guitar, mandolin, vocals
Buddy Fambro, Mark Goldenberg, Albert Lee, Pops Staples, Jay Farrar, Taj Mahal, Doc Watson, Tim Stafford, Norman Blake, Steve Connolly, Jimmy Driftwood, Max Johnston – guitar, vocals 
Bernie Leadon – guitar, mandolin, banjo, vocals 
Hassan Kahn, Jerry Scheff, Tony Levin, Jack Herrick, Jeff Tweedy, Harold Floyd, Steve Edelman, Jon Schofield, Barry Bales – bass
Garth Hudson – accordion, keyboards
Levon Helm – mandolin, vocals
Chris Frank – accordion
Bob Murphy, Michael Holmes, Peter Bull – keyboards, vocals
Fiachna O'Braonain – guitar, vocals
Tony Harrigan – tin whistle
Peter O'Toole – bouzouki, bass
Liam Ó Maonlaí – bodhrán, piano
Leo Barnes – B3 organ, saxophone
Bland Simpson – piano
Mitchell Froom – B3 organ
William T. Mason, Denny Fongheiser, Kenny Aronoff, Jerry Marotta, Jerry Fehily, Mike Heidorn, Waldo LaTowsky, Martin Parker, Michael Barclay – drums
Jack Irons – snare

Charts

References

1991 albums
Michelle Shocked albums
Albums produced by Don Was
Albums produced by Hugh Padgham
Mercury Records albums